All the Greatest Hits is the first official greatest hits album by American funk band Zapp (then credited as Zapp & Roger), released October 26, 1993, via Reprise Records. The album contains songs Zapp performed as a band from their first four albums, as well as songs from Roger Troutman's solo albums. It peaked at No. 39 on the Billboard 200 and No. 9 on the R&B chart.

Two new songs were also included on the album: "Mega Medley" and "Slow and Easy", which were released as singles. The latter is the band's highest chart appearance to date on the Billboard Hot 100, peaking at No. 43 in 1993.

Track listing

Charts

Certifications

References

External links
 
 

1993 greatest hits albums
Funk compilation albums
Reprise Records compilation albums
Zapp (band) albums